Thuli Visham is a 1954 Indian Tamil-language film, directed by A. S. A. Sami. The film stars K. R. Ramasamy, Sivaji Ganesan and Krishna Kumari. It was released on 30 July 1954.

Plot

Cast 
Adapted from the song book and the opening credits.

Male cast
 K. R. Ramasamy as Chandran
 Sivaji Ganesan as Suryakanthan
 S. V. Ranga Rao as Veeramarthandan
 Mukkamala as Malaiyaman
 D. V. Narayanasami as Jayankonda Thevar
 T. V. Radhakrishnan as Karumbu
 Kottapuli Jayaraman as Sivakozhundu
 Pottai Krishnamoorthi as Kothandam
 K. Natarajan as Prime Minister

Female cast
 T. Krishnakumari as Nagavalli
 P. K. Saraswathi as Angayarkanni
 S. D. Subbulakshmi as Maha Devi
 T. P. Muthulakshmi as Pooncholai
 Reeta as Murali
Dance
 Kerala Sisters

Soundtrack 
The music was composed by K. N. Dandayudhapani Pillai. Lyrics were by K. P. Kamatchi Sundharam.

References

External links 
 

1954 films
1950s Tamil-language films